ArenaBowl '92 (or ArenaBowl VI) was the Arena Football League's sixth Arena Bowl. The game featured the #2 Detroit Drive (8–2) against the #1 Orlando Predators (9–1). Earlier in the regular season, these two teams met with the Predators winning 50–49 in the "Miracle Minute."

Game summary
In the first quarter, the Predators struck first with Kicker Jorge Cimadevilla getting a 48-yard Field Goal. The Drive responded with FB/LB Broderick Sargent getting a one-yard touchdown run. Afterwards, Orlando responded with Cimadevilla kicking a 36-yard Field Goal.

In the second quarter, Cimadevilla went right back to work for the Predators with a 26-yard field goal, yet Detroit came right back with WR/DB Rodney McSwain recovering an Orlando fumble in the endzone for a touchdown. Afterwards, the Predators responded with Quarterback Ben Bennett completing an eight-yard touchdown pass to OL/DL Eric Drakes. Immediately after Orlando's score, the Drive struck again with OS George LaFrance returning a kickoff 57 yards for a touchdown. Afterwards, the Predators closed out the half with Bennett completing an 8-yard TD pass to WR/DB Carl Aikens.

In the third quarter, Detroit started taking control with OL/DL Flint Fleming getting a one-yard touchdown run, while Quarterback Gilbert Renfroe completed a 24-yard touchdown pass to LaFrance.

In the fourth quarter, Orlando tried to fight back with Cimadevilla nailing a 31-yard Field Goal, yet Detroit replied with Renfroe completing a 15-yard touchdown pass to Langeloh (the kicker). The Predators tried to answer back with Bennett completing a 20-yard touchdown pass to WR/DB Herkie Walls (with a failed PAT), yet the Drive answered with Renfroe completing a 17-yard touchdown pass to WR/DB Gary Mullen. Afterwards, all that was left of Orlando's comeback was Bennett's seven-yard touchdown pass to WR/LB Bryan Moore.

With the win, Detroit won its fourth ArenaBowl title in five seasons.

Scoring summary
1st Quarter
 ORL – FG Cimadevilla 48
 DET – Sargent 1 run (Langeloh kick)
 ORL – FG Cimadevilla 36
2nd Quarter
 ORL – FG Cimadevilla 26
 DET – McSwain 0 Fumble Recovery (Langeloh kick)
 ORL – Drakes 8 pass from Bennett (Cimadevilla kick)
 DET – LaFrance 57 Kickoff Return (Langeloh kick)
 ORL – Aikens 8 pass from Bennett (Cimadevilla kick)
3rd Quarter
 DET – Fleming 1 run (Langeloh kick)
 DET – LaFrance 24 pass from Renfroe (Langeloh kick)
4th Quarter
 ORL – FG Cimadevilla 31
 DET – Langeloh 15 from Renfroe (Langeloh kick)
 ORL – Walls 20 pass from Bennett (Cimadevilla kick failed)
 DET – Mullen 17 pass from Renfroe (Langeloh kick)
 ORL – Moore 7 pass from Bennett (Schlichter pass failed)

References

External links
 ArenaFan box score

006
1992 Arena Football League season
Massachusetts Marauders
Orlando Predators
1992 in sports in Florida
Sports competitions in Orlando, Florida
1992 in American television
August 1992 sports events in the United States
1990s in Orlando, Florida